Yuliyan Chapaev (born 3 July 1996) is a Bulgarian footballer who currently plays as a defender for Bulgarian Third League club Rilski Sportist.

References

External links
 

1996 births
Living people
Bulgarian footballers
First Professional Football League (Bulgaria) players
PFC CSKA Sofia players
RB Leipzig players
FC Montana players
Association football defenders
Expatriate footballers in Germany
Sportspeople from Pleven